Education in West Bengal is provided by both the public sector as well as the private sector. The modern education system was developed by the British missionaries and the Indian social reformists. West Bengal has many institutes of higher education like –Amity University,Visva-Bharati University, Marine Engineering and Research Institute, Jadavpur University, Aliah University, Indian Institute of Management Calcutta, Indian Institute of Technology Kharagpur, Indian Institute of Engineering Science and Technology, Shibpur, Indian Institute of Science Education and Research, Kolkata, National Institute of Technology, Durgapur, Indian Institute of Information Technology, Kalyani, Indian Statistical Institute, West Bengal University of Health Sciences, University of North Bengal and University of Calcutta.

History

Kolkata has played a pioneering role in the development of the modern education system in India. Western models of education came to India through Kolkata. Many of the first schools and colleges were established by the missionaries and reformists. Sir William Jones (philologist) established the Asiatic Society in 1784 for promoting oriental studies. People like Ram Mohan Roy, David Hare, Ishwar Chandra Vidyasagar, Shashi Bhusan Chatterjee, and William Carey played a leading role in the setting up of modern schools and colleges in the city. The Fort William College was established in 1800. The Hindu College was established in 1817. In 1855, the Hindu College, Calcutta was renamed as the Presidency College.

William Carey established the Serampore College in Serampore City (30 km from Calcutta), 1818. It went on to become India's first modern university in 1827 when it was incorporated by a Royal Charter as a Danish University. Although it had the charter, it was not technically a university in the modern sense of that term. The Sanskrit College was established in 1824. Reverend Alexander Duff of the Church of Scotland established the General Assembly's Institution in 1830 and later the Free Church Institution in 1844, which were later merged to form what is now known as the Scottish Church College, Calcutta. These institutions played a significant role in what came to be known as the Young Bengal Movement and the Bengal Renaissance. La Martiniere Calcutta was established in 1836. John Bethune established a school for Indian girls in 1850 at a time when women's education was frowned upon in the society. The Bethune College for girls was set up by him in 1879.

The oldest medical school in Asia, the Calcutta Medical College was set up in 1835. In 1857, the University of Calcutta was established as the first full-fledged multi-disciplinary university in south Asia. It was modelled on the lines of the University of London. Today it is amongst the largest multidisciplinary universities of India and offers some of the widest number of academic disciplines for study. In 1856 technical and engineering education came with the establishment of a civil engineering college / department. This setup went through various reorganisations to finally become the Bengal Engineering College in 1921. The Jesuit administered St Xavier's College was established in 1860. In 1906, the partition of Bengal led to widespread nationalistic and anti British feelings. This led to the setting up of the National Council of Education, Bengal. This later on became the Jadavpur University in 1955.  The nation's first homeopathy college was established in the city in 1880. In 1883 Kadambini Ganguly and Chandramukhi Basu became the first women graduates from the University of Calcutta. In the process, they became the first female graduates of the British Empire. Kadambini went on to become the first female physician trained in the Western system of medicine in South Asia. The Science College was established in 1917. The first blind school came into being in 1925.

After independence, Calcutta continued to be in the forefront of the educational scene. The Government College of Art & Craft was established in 1951. The Rabindra Bharati University was established in 1962. This university offers courses in the fine and performing arts. The Indian Institute of Social Welfare and Business Management was set up in 1953 as the country's first management institute and is also the first in the country to offer an MBA degree of a university.  The first, Indian Institute of Technology was set up at Kharagpur about 120 km from Calcutta. In 1960 the Regional Engineering college (presently National Institute of Technology) at Durgapur was set up. It is amongst the top NITs in India and also among the oldest. Indian Institute of Management Calcutta, the first among the Indian Institutes of Management, was set up in 1961 at Joka. It was the first national institute for post-graduate studies and research in management sciences. It was established with the help of the MIT Sloan School of Management and the Ford Foundation.

Structure

West Bengal schools are run by the School Education Department, West Bengal government or by private organisations, including religious institutions. Instruction is mainly in English or Bengali, though Urdu is also used, especially in Central Kolkata. The secondary schools are affiliated with the Council for the Indian School Certificate Examinations (CISCE), the Central Board for Secondary Education (CBSE), the National Institute of Open School (NIOS) or the West Bengal Board of Secondary Education. Under the 10+2+3 plan, after completing secondary school, students typically enroll for 2 years in a junior college, also known as pre-university, or in schools with a higher secondary facility affiliated with the West Bengal Council of Higher Secondary Education or any central board. Students choose from one of three streams, namely liberal arts, commerce or science. Upon completing the required coursework, students may enrol in general or professional degree programs. South Point School, St. Xaviers Collegiate School, Baranagore Ramakrishna Mission Ashrama High School etc. are some of the best schools of West Bengal.

Major universities

In West Bengal there is one central university, twenty seven state universities, eleven private universities and two deemed university. Besides, there are three Regional Centres of IGNOU at Siliguri, Kolkata and Raghunathganj and one Sub - Regional Centre of IGNOU at Darjeeling.

State universities

Central University

Centrally Funded Technical Institutes & Other institution Campuses 
 Ghani Khan Choudhury Institute of Engineering & Technology, Malda
 National Institute of Technical Teachers' Training and Research, Kolkata
 National Power Training Institute Durgapur Campus
 IIFT, Kolkata Campus
 Marine Engineering and Research Institute
 Footwear Design and Development Institute Kolkata Campus

Institute of National Importance

Deemed universities

Private universities

Research Institutes

Medical Colleges

See also
 Universities and colleges of West Bengal
 Kolkata
 List of schools of West Bengal

References
68.    List of All Government ITI Colleges in West Bengal. 18 Oct 2020